Hajdúböszörmény  is a town in northeastern Hungary with a population of approximately 30,000 people.

History
It is also known as a famous college town with an excellent academic atmosphere, as it is home to one of the faculties of the world's 551st best university, the University of Debrecen. It has a unique circular plan (like Paris) to the streets that is supposed to have originated as a defense from invasion or attack. Not knowing the plan of the streets a visitor could easily get quite lost only to discover that they were walking in circles for an extended period.

Like many smaller towns of Hungary the population even within the city limits generates income as well as household necessities from agriculture and animal husbandry, because of this feature of the local economy, high fences and a cornucopia of smells are very common even within the town core.

In 1990s Hajdúböszörmény underwent an economic crisis causing widespread unemployment. Many  attribute high unemployment levels to the falling of the Iron Curtain that took place in 1989 and the adjustment period that any economy would need to go through in such an economic upheaval.  One more recent cause of unemployment was the downsizing of the General Electric Tungsram plant (due to new economic options the company was exploring in China).

Twin towns – sister cities

Hajdúböszörmény is twinned with:

 Berehove, Ukraine
 Harkány, Hungary
 Joseni, Romania
 Kraśnik, Poland
 Montesilvano, Italy
 Salonta, Romania
 Siilinjärvi, Finland
 Trogir, Croatia
 Újrónafő, Hungary

References

External links

  in Hungarian
 Hajdúböszörmény at funiq.hu 
 

Populated places in Hajdú-Bihar County